Germaine Beaumont (1890-1983) was a French journalist and writer. Her real name was Germaine Battendier. She was born in the Petit-Couronne and died in Montfort-l'Amaury at the age of 92. The author of more than a dozen books, she is best known for her 1930 book Piège which won the prix Renaudot.

References

French women writers
French women journalists
1890 births
1983 deaths
20th-century French women
Prix Renaudot winners